Anthony Theodore Felix Lobo (4 July 1937 – 18 February 2013) was a Pakistani Roman Catholic bishop. On 8 June 1982 he was appointed Auxiliary Bishop of Karachi by Pope John Paul II. On 28 May 1993 he became Bishop of Islamabad–Rawalpindi.

Biography
Lobo was born in Karachi, British India (now Pakistan) on 4 July 1937, to Joseph and Ermina Lobo, Catholics of Goan origin. He received his early education at Saint Patrick's High School and his religious training at the Christ the King seminary in Karachi, and was ordained a priest in Karachi on 8 January 1961. He also has degrees from the University of Karachi, Harvard and Paris.

Bishop Lobo made important contributions to education in the country. He was Principal of St. Lawrence's Boys School, Karachi and later of Saint Patrick's High School, Karachi. In November 1986 he founded St. Michael's Convent School. He was the author of many books on education. In recognition of his services to the cause of literature and education, the President of Pakistan conferred on him the Presidential Pride of Performance Award in 1990.

In his efforts to bring improvements in the Pakistani education system, he sought assistance from Australia to create the Notre Dame Institute of Education in Karachi in 1991.

Bishop Lobo also served in the following positions:
Chairman, Education Commission of Pakistan.
Secretary General, Catholic Bishop Conference Of Pakistan.
Chairman, Office of Education, Federation Of Asian Bishop's Conference.
Member of Senate, Shah Abdul Latif University, Khairpur.
Member of Senate, Sindh University, Jamshoro.
Member of the board for Oasis magazine, Cairo, Egypt. The magazine focuses on the need for interreligious dialogue and peace.
Spiritual Director of the St. Vincent's Home for the Aged, Karachi.
On 18 February 2010, Bishop Lobo resigned as Bishop of Islamabad-Rawalpindi due to ill health and was automatically succeeded by Bishop Rufin Anthony.

Bishop Lobo died on the morning of 18 February 2013 at Rawalpindi-Islamabad.  He was buried in the compound of St. Joseph's Cathedral, Rawalpindi.
 The Express Tribune asked Yolande Henderson, a former headmistress of St Patrick's to write a tribute to the late Bishop Lobo.

References

1937 births
People from Karachi
20th-century Roman Catholic bishops in Pakistan
St. Patrick's High School, Karachi alumni
21st-century Roman Catholic bishops in Pakistan
Goan Catholics
Harvard University alumni
University of Paris alumni
University of Karachi alumni
Pakistani educators
Recipients of the Pride of Performance
2013 deaths
Pakistani people of Goan descent
Roman Catholic bishops of Islamabad-Rawalpindi